Measles was declared eliminated from the United States in 2000 by the World Health Organization due to the success of vaccination efforts. However, it continues to be reintroduced by international travelers, and in recent years, anti-vaccination sentiment has allowed for the reemergence of measles outbreaks.

In 2018, 371 cases of measles were confirmed in the United States. From January to August 2019, 1215 cases across 30 states had been confirmed as measles by the Centers for Disease Control and Prevention (CDC). This is the largest number of cases in one calendar year since the disease was declared eliminated. In 2019, a state of emergency was declared in New York City and Washington in response to the extremely contagious disease. There is concern that the World Health Organization (WHO) may rescind the U.S.'s measles elimination status.

The vast majority of people infected had not received vaccination and were living in close-knit communities where the immunization rate is lower than average. The director of the National Institutes of Health wrote in 2016 that parents refusing to vaccinate their children were leading to outbreaks of preventable diseases, including measles. The World Health Organization also reported that the rise in measles is a direct result of anti-vaccination movements. The recommended measles vaccination protocol is to receive two doses, at least one month apart. One dose of the vaccination is 93 percent effective at preventing measles, while two doses is 97 percent effective.

Measles is one of the most contagious of infectious diseases. If not immunized, a person exposed to someone with measles has a 95% chance of becoming infected. During the early stage of an outbreak in an unvaccinated population, each infected person spreads the disease to an average of 12 to 18 other people.

History 

Before the vaccine was available in the United States, the Centers for Disease Control and Prevention (CDC) estimated that about three to four million were infected each year, of which approx. 500,000 were reported, with 400 to 500 people dying and 48,000 being hospitalized as a result.
The last major outbreak was before the disease was eliminated, and occurred from 1989 to 1991. During this outbreak, 123 people died, the majority of whom were preschool children.

In the United States on average, two or three out of every 1000 children infected will die, and one will develop complications that often result in permanent brain damage.

The 2019 outbreak prompted President Donald Trump to shift away from his previous goal of spacing out vaccinations, and to insist that parents must vaccinate their children, stating "They have to get the shots. The vaccinations are so important". The Trump Administration also took a forceful position of requiring vaccination, with Trump's Surgeon General Jerome Adams calling for limitations on exemptions to vaccination.

Local outbreaks 

There was one outbreak in 2015, involving 147 cases linked to exposure at Disneyland in California; one outbreak in 2017, among a largely unvaccinated Somali community in Minnesota; and 17 reported outbreaks in 2018. In 2019, cases were reported in 23 states, and the total number of reported cases (764) reached the highest number in 25 years by April. More than 500 of these cases were people who were not vaccinated against measles, and another 125 had an unknown vaccination status. The bulk of those infected were from the Orthodox Jewish communities in and around New York City.

Washington and Oregon

The areas surrounding Vancouver, Washington, namely in Clark County, experienced an outbreak of measles in late 2018 and early 2019. The area was referred to as an "anti-vaccination hotspot" and the vaccination rate was 78%, which is too low for herd immunity. Oregon had reported that four residents have contracted measles due to the outbreak in neighboring Clark County.

As of April 2019, 74 confirmed cases of measles had been reported to the health department. More than half of those who fell ill were under the age of 10, and 70 of them had not been vaccinated or had unknown vaccination status. The remaining three people had received one dose of the measles vaccine.

In response to the outbreak, Representative Paul Harris proposed a measure that would remove the ability for parents to refuse any of the required childhood vaccines for philosophical reasons, otherwise keeping medical and religious exemptions. The bill was later amended to limit exemptions for the measles, mumps, rubella vaccine (MMR) vaccine. Children would not be allowed to attend public or private schools or day-care without evidence of vaccination or approved exemption documents. The bill was passed in April 2019.

New York 

New York experienced outbreaks in New York City and Rockland County in 2018 and 2019.

Between October 2018 and April 2019, 423 confirmed cases of measles were reported in New York City. The areas of Williamsburg and Borough Park, two Brooklyn neighborhoods with a high concentration of Orthodox Jews, have been most heavily affected. In response to the outbreak, Mayor Bill de Blasio declared a state of emergency and ordered mandatory vaccinations in the neighborhoods corresponding to the zip codes 11205, 11206, 11211, and 11249. It required that everyone living or working in the neighborhood who is more than six months old receive a vaccination or be subject to a $1,000 fine. Prior to the order, the health commissioner had required schools and day care centers in the area deny service to unvaccinated students to prevent the disease from spreading. In April, city officials ordered the closure of a preschool that refused to cooperate with requests for vaccination information.

From October to April, 153 cases of measles were confirmed in Rockland County, New York. Despite 17,000 doses of the MMR vaccination being given, the vaccination rate of children in the area was 72.9 percent as of April.

In December 2018, public health officials in Rockland County banned unvaccinated students from attending school. Parents of 42 students at Green Meadow Waldorf School, a private school, sued the Rockland County health department, but a judge denied the request to overturn the order. According to the health department, Green Meadow Waldorf School had a 56% vaccination rate.

In March 2019, a flight attendant flew from NYC to Tel Aviv, Israel. Passengers on the flight were informed several days later that the woman had developed measles encephalitis and is in the Intensive Care Unit (ICU) on a ventilator. The Israeli Ministry of Health reported that the woman may have been exposed in New York or in Israel.

In April 2019, a state of emergency was declared in Rockland County, and unvaccinated children were barred from public places for 30 days. Parents of unvaccinated children that did not abide by this condition faced up to six months in jail or a $500 fine. A judge later lifted this ban, saying that the outbreak did not qualify for an emergency order. That month, New York began considering legislation to join the seven states and Washington DC that allow children 14 years and older to seek vaccination without parental consent.

In June 2019, New York State enacted a law repealing religious and philosophical exemptions for vaccination. The association of the outbreak with the Jewish community led to a rise in instances of antisemitism being expressed in New York.

Michigan 
A man from Israel traveled into New York, where he spent a few weeks before making his way to Michigan in March 2019, while unknowingly infected with measles. Health officials reported that he spread the virus to 38 people there. Because he was fundraising for Orthodox Jewish charities, he visited several synagogues each day while there. The man, who was not a US citizen, told health officials through a translator that he believed that he was immune to measles because he had it as a child.

People do not acquire measles again after infection, so Doctors believe he was either lying about prior infection, or perhaps due to being a citizen of Europe, had rubella (German Measles) which is a different virus, that shares symptoms with measles.

New Jersey 
The CDC declared an outbreak in New Jersey in late 2018. 30 of the 33 confirmed cases were in Ocean County. It was determined that measles was contracted by a person who traveled to Israel and spread the virus upon returning to New Jersey.

California 
The CDC tracks the rate of vaccination at kindergartens. While statewide, California has a 97 percent vaccination rate for kindergarteners, some schools, particularly in the Bay Area, have vaccination rates below 50%. In 2018, the Santa Cruz Waldorf School in Santa Cruz had a vaccination rate of 33 percent. In 2014, Berkeley Rose School, a Waldorf school in Alameda County, had a vaccination rate of 13 percent. In 2016, California eliminated "philosophical objections" as a reason for parents to refuse to vaccinate their children. Following this, the vaccination rate at Berkeley Rose increased to 57 percent.

During the Disneyland measles outbreak, in 2015, a person infected with measles exposed others while visiting Disneyland. This led to the infection of 131 California residents, as well as people in six other states, Canada, and Mexico. Following this outbreak, California changed its vaccination laws to only allow vaccination exemptions for those with medical conditions.

From January to April 2019, 21 cases of measles were reported in California. The CDC published in the Morbidity and Mortality Weekly Report a summary of one outbreak caused by an unvaccinated teenager traveling to England.

During the 2019 resurgence that April, two California universities, Cal State Los Angeles and University of California, Los Angeles, had to quarantine over 300 students and faculty to prevent the spread of measles after persons now known to have measles used public buildings.

American Samoa 
On December 8, 2019, American Samoa declared an outbreak of measles, after nine positive cases, four of which are suspected of being locally transmitted.

Combating methods
With the 2019 outbreak, the CDC stated that it may use its ability to put people on a "Do Not Board" list for air travel should people known to be carrying measles continue to fly. This list was established in 2007, to combat tuberculosis, but was used to restrict travel of two people during the 2014 measles outbreak. The CDC has, in the past, told some individuals that they believe might have been infected with measles to not use air travel, with those patients voluntarily agreeing to alter travel plans. The CDC states that normally it would be extremely rare to catch measles from an infected passenger due to the overall high rate of vaccinated passengers on average, but the recent anti-vaccination trends threatens to disrupt that model.

Social media platforms have made their own efforts to prevent the dissemination of false anti-vaccination claims. As of September 2018, Pinterest had banned users from searching for content about vaccines. In January 2019, Facebook announced that it will be banning posts promoting anti-vaccination propaganda, and the website will no longer be suggesting anti-vaccination pages or groups for users to join. In February 2019, YouTube stated that any user or channel endorsing anti-vaccination content will be demonetized entirely, and not receive any funding for advertisements played before videos.

A number of U.S. states tightened vaccine exemptions in the wake of the outbreak, including New York, Washington, and Maine. Vaccination opponents forced a referendum on the issue in Maine, but the new restrictions prevailed with over 70% of voters supporting them.

References 

2019 disasters in the United States
2019 measles outbreaks
Ableism
Infectious diseases with eradication efforts
Measles outbreaks
Disease outbreaks in the United States